Simona Grozdanovska (born 15 April 1988) is a Macedonian handball player for ŽRK Metalurg and the Macedonian national team.

References

1988 births
Living people
Macedonian female handball players